Shahivand District is a district in Dowreh County, Lorestan Province, Iran. The 2006 census showed that its total population was 20,294, and it has 2,125 families. The District is entirely rural. In the district is the Kashkan river. Most of the people work on fields and cultivate grain. Some families depend on their livestock and earn money from the sale of their animals’ by-products. These animals are chickens, goats, sheep, and cows.

References 

Districts of Lorestan Province
Dowreh County